Stephen O'Shaughnessy (born 13 October 1967) is a Welsh former professional footballer who was most recently manager of Airbus UK Broughton. As a player, he made more than 200 appearances in the Football League.

O'Shaughnessy or "Shaughssa" as he is affectionately known was born in Wrexham and started his career as an apprentice at Leeds United, before moving onto Bradford City, where he made one league appearance.

In 1988, O'Shaughnessy was signed by former Leeds United midfielder and manager Eddie Gray for Rochdale. In three seasons at Spotland, O'Shaughnessy enjoyed arguably the most successful spell in his career scoring 16 goals in 109 League appearances and reaching the 5th Round of the 1990 FA Cup . During this time, O'Shaughnessy earned the nickname the "Master Blaster" for his skill at taking long distance free-kicks.

In July 1991, O'Shaughnessy joined Exeter City for £10,000. After a disappointing three-game spell at St James Park under 1966 FIFA World Cup winner Alan Ball, which saw him sent off at Huddersfield Town, O'Shaughnessy joined Darlington in January 1992.

In 88 League appearances for the Quakers, Steve became team captain before being released at the end of the 1993–94 season, with his final Football League appearance coming on 7 May 1994 against Bury.

After this, Steve went to a roundabout of clubs, including Stalybridge Celtic and Buler Rangers in Hong Kong, before returning to play in the League of Wales.

In 153 League of Wales appearances, O'Shaughnessy played for Inter Cardiff, Barry Town, Holywell Town, Rhyl, Caernarfon Town, T.N.S. Llansantfraid, Bangor City, Oswestry Town and NEWI Cefn Druids.

In 1999, O'Shaughnessy was appointed player-manager of Oswestry Town.

On 27 September 2006, O'Shaughnessy was named as the new manager of Caernarfon Town.

In June 2008, O'Shaughnessy left Caernarfon Town and joined Connah's Quay Nomads as manager, but left the club after one season in charge.

After serving as assistant, he was appointed as manager of Airbus UK Broughton in November 2016.
On 24th September 2022, Steve O Shaughnessy, left Airbus UK Broughton.

References

1967 births
Living people
Welsh footballers
Association football midfielders
Association football central defenders
Bradford City A.F.C. players
Rochdale A.F.C. players
Exeter City F.C. players
Darlington F.C. players
Rhyl F.C. players
Bangor City F.C. players
Barry Town United F.C. players
The New Saints F.C. players
Hong Kong Rangers FC players
Cymru Premier players
Cymru Premier managers
English Football League players
Footballers from Wrexham
Hong Kong First Division League players
Caernarfon Town F.C. managers
Oswestry Town F.C. managers
Connah's Quay Nomads F.C. managers
Cefn Druids A.F.C. managers
Cefn Druids A.F.C. players
Oswestry Town F.C. players
Holywell Town F.C. players
Cardiff Metropolitan University F.C. players
Gresford Athletic F.C. players
Welsh football managers
Airbus UK Broughton F.C. managers